Tunkhannock Creek is a  tributary of Tobyhanna Creek in the Poconos of eastern Pennsylvania in the United States.

Tunkhannock Creek joins Tobyhanna Creek near Blakeslee in Monroe County.

See also
 List of rivers of Pennsylvania

References

External links
 U.S. Geological Survey: PA stream gaging stations

Tributaries of the Lehigh River
Rivers of Pennsylvania
Pocono Mountains
Rivers of Monroe County, Pennsylvania